The Akaflieg Stuttgart fs32, nicknamed Aguila (Spanish: Eagle) is a sailplane designed and built in Germany in 1992.

Specifications

References

Further reading

External links

1990s German sailplanes
Glider aircraft
Aircraft first flown in 1992
Akaflieg Stuttgart aircraft